Heitai is a town in southeastern Heilongjiang province, China.

Heitai may also refer to:

 A soldier, especially of the Imperial Japanese Army

See also
 Heita Kawakatsu, Chinese politician and former governor of Shizuoka Prefecture